Protepicyon is an extinct monospecific genus of the Borophaginae subfamily of canids native to North America. It lived during the Barstovian stage of the Middle Miocene 16.0—13.6 mya. One of the top predators of its time, it was the probable ancestor of the better known Epicyon, and is known from remains in California and New Mexico.

References

zipcodezoo.com
serials.cib.unibo.it
calphotos.berkeley.edu
Flynn, J.J., 1998. Early Cenozoic Carnivora ("Miacoidea"). pages 648–651  in C.M. Janis, K.M. Scott, and L.L. Jacobs (eds.) Evolution of Tertiary Mammals of North America. Volume 1: Terrestrial Carnivores, Ungulates, and Ungulatelike Mammals. Cambridge University Press, Cambridge. 
The Biology and Conservation of Wild Canids by David W. Macdonald, and Claudio Sillero-Zubiri; published Published 2004 (Oxford University Press). Page 40, 

Borophagines
Prehistoric carnivoran genera
Miocene carnivorans
Serravallian extinctions
Miocene mammals of North America
Burdigalian first appearances